Kween Kong is the stage name of Thomas Fonua, a Pasifika New Zealander drag performer most known for competing on the second season of RuPaul's Drag Race Down Under as a runner-up. She is based in Adelaide and won DragNationAUS.

Fonua is originally from New Zealand with Samoan and Tongan descent.

A 2014 recipient of the New Zealand Prime Minister's Pacific Youth Award for Arts and Creativity,Fonua joined the Australian Dance Theatre in 2014.Prior to this, he was a guest teacher at the Banff Centre for Arts and Creativity.

Filmography

Television

References

Living people

Year of birth missing (living people)
New Zealand drag queens
Australian drag queens
RuPaul's Drag Race Down Under contestants
New Zealand people of Samoan descent
New Zealand people of Tongan descent